Chad Richison Stadium  (formerly Wantland Stadium) is the on-campus football facility for the University of Central Oklahoma Bronchos in Edmond, Oklahoma. The official seating capacity of the stadium, following recent renovations, is 10,000, making it tied for the 16th largest Division II stadium, and tied with Walton Stadium of the University of Central Missouri and Francis G. Welch Stadium of Emporia State University for the largest in the Mid-America Intercollegiate Athletics Association.

History
The stadium opened in 1965, and was originally named Wantland Stadium after former Broncho head coach Charles W. Wantland. The stadium is a dual sided with a grass berm that imitates a horseshoe-shaped facility with its long axis oriented north/south, with the south end enclosed by grass and the north end bounded by the Sports Performance Center. Visitor seating is on the east sideline. The student seating sections are in Section 102 located in the west stands on the south side, next to the UCO Stampede of Sound which is near the south goalline. The Bronchos' bench is also located along the west side.

Chad Richison Stadium underwent a dramatic facelift in the summer of 2005 with the addition of a three-level press box that includes club seating and new stands on both sides of the field. Artificial turf, new lighting and a state-of-the-art scoreboard were added to the facility in 2003. In 2014 a new videoboard was installed.

In 2017, the university began construction of a 45,000 square feet sports performance center located along the north end zone. The Sports Performance Center opened during the 2018 season.

During the 2021 season after a $10 million donation from Paycom CEO and former Broncho wrestler Chad Richison, the university renamed the structure Chad Richison Stadium.

Events

The Stadium also hosted the 1982 NAIA Championship Game. The Bronchos played against Mesa State. The Bronchos clinched their 2nd crown winning 14-11, in front of a national audience on the USA Network.

Wantland Stadium was the home field for all three Edmond high school teams, Memorial, Santa Fe, and North. Edmond Public Schools leased the facility from UCO for $7,252 per game. As part of the lease EPS collected all revenue from ticket sales, and concessions. In 2015 Edmond Santa Fe opened their football stadium and the other EPS schools shifted their games to on-campus stadiums. UCO has hosted the Oklahoma All-State Football Game in the facility six times since 1994. The stadium also hosts the annual UCO Stampede of Sound's Invitational Marching Band Contest. It also has hosted the class 6A Oklahoma Bandmaster's Association (OBA) Marching Contest several times. In February 2015, voters passed a $91 million bond issue which included expansion of a football field near Santa Fe High School. In 2016, Wantland hosted the OSSAA Class 5A football championship game.

References

College football venues
Buildings and structures in Oklahoma County, Oklahoma
American football venues in Oklahoma
Central Oklahoma Bronchos football